Clausia may refer to:
 Clausia (copepod), a genus of crustaceans in the family Clausiidae
 Clausia (plant), a genus of flowering plants in the family Brassicaceae